Eype is a small village in southwest Dorset, England, situated  southwest of Bridport. It lies on the Jurassic Coast World Heritage Site on the English Channel and is within the civil parish of Symondsbury.

Eype means "steep place". Many of the village buildings can be traced back to the late eighteenth or early nineteenth centuries, but little is known in detail until the Victorian era.

In 2011 a beach hut at Eype Beach went on the market for £200,000.

A notable resident was the antiques dealer Paul Atterbury.

St Peter's Church is regularly used for art exhibitions, known as Eype Centre for the Arts and was also used to record P.J. Harvey's Mercury prize-winning Let England Shake

The village contains Eype's Mouth Country Hotel, The New Inn (operated by Palmers Brewery), Eype House Caravan and Camping Park and Highlands End Holiday Park.

References

External links 

Villages in Dorset